Meghalaya Democratic Alliance was a state-level alliance in the Meghalaya Legislative Assembly led by National People's Party.
The Post-Poll Alliance won majority in 2018 Meghalaya Legislative Assembly election but did not contest unitedly in 2023 Meghalaya Legislative Assembly election as NPP decided to go solo. Other parties also declared to contest alone or in small regional alliance in one or more constituencies.

Members

References

 
Politics of India
Political parties in India